Robert Barker may refer to:

Politicians
 Robert Barker (MP for Ipswich) (died 1571), English MP for Ipswich
 Robert Barker (MP for Thetford), English MP for Thetford
 Robert Barker (MP for Colchester) (1563–1618), English MP for Colchester
 Robert Barker (died 1618), English MP for Ipswich
 Sir Robert Barker, 1st Baronet (1732–1789), British Army officer and politician
 Robert Hewitt Barker (1887–1961), British businessman and politician
 Robert L. Barker (died 2010), North Carolina State Senator

Others
 Robert Barker (footballer) (1847–1915), English footballer who played for England
 Robert Barker (painter) (1739–1806), English painter
 Robert Barker (physician) (died 1745), British physician and inventor
 Robert Barker (printer) (died 1645), English printer
 Robert Lee Barker (born 1937), American psychotherapist, author, editor, and professor of social work
 Bob Barker (born 1923), American game show host
 Bootie Barker (born 1971), crew chief in the NASCAR Sprint Cup stock car racing series